Fritillaria eduardii  is a species of flowering plant in the lily family Liliaceae, native to Central Asia. It is closely related to the widely cultivated species, F. imperialis, called "crown imperial."

Varieties
 Fritillaria eduardii var. inodora (Regel) Wietsma - Tajikistan, Uzbekistan
 Fritillaria eduardii var. eduardii - Tajikistan, Uzbekistan, Kyrgyzstan

References

eduardii
Plants described in 1884
Flora of Central Asia
Garden plants